The Imlay Creek is a perennial river of the Genoa River catchment, with its headwaters and lower reaches located in the South Coast region of New South Wales, Australia.

Course and features
The Imlay Creek rises below Mount Imlay within Mount Imlay National Park, and flows generally north, and then south, before reaching its confluence with the Wallagaraugh River northwest of Timbillica. The river descends  over its  course.

See also

 Mount Imlay National Park
 List of rivers of New South Wales (A-K)
 List of rivers of Australia
 Rivers of New South Wales

References

External links
 

Rivers of New South Wales
South Coast (New South Wales)